Ralph Delano Cook (born April 29, 1944) was a justice of the Supreme Court of Alabama from 1993 to 2001. Governor Jim Folsom appointed Cook to finish the term of Oscar Adams upon Adams' retirement.

Early life, education, and career
Raised in Jefferson County, Alabama, Cook was "the second of three children of Joe and Nannie Cook", who owned and operated a cleaning service in Bessemer. Cook received his B.S. from Tennessee State University and his J.D. from Howard University School of Law. He thereafter moved to California, where he taught at San Jose State University and at Cabrillo College. He was an administrative analyst for the city of Berkeley, California, from 1971 to 1973, leaving at the end of 1973 to take a position as a deputy district attorney in Alabama.

After returning to Alabama, he also taught at Miles Law School, and was named the dean of the law school in September 1976, serving in that capacity until 1990.

Judicial career
Cook was the first black person to be elected to a state district judgeship in Jefferson County, Alabama, the largest county in the state, where he served for four and a half years. He thereafter became the first black person to be elected to the circuit court for the same county.

Cook was sworn in as a justice of the state supreme court in November 1993. In November 1994, Cook, running as a Democrat defeated Republican challenger Mark Montiel to win election to a full term on the court. In his 2000 bid for reelection to the court, however, Cook was defeated by Republican challenger Lyn Stuart.

Personal life
Cook married Charlsie Davis, also of Jefferson County, with whom he had two daughters and a son.

References

1944 births
Living people
People from Jefferson County, Alabama
Deans of law schools in the United States
Justices of the Supreme Court of Alabama
African-American judges
Tennessee State University alumni
Howard University School of Law alumni
Alabama Democrats
American university and college faculty deans
African-American academic administrators
21st-century American judges
20th-century American judges